William Ellis Delenbough "Ellie" Pringle (August 31, 1910 – October 3, 1990), known as Ellis Pringle, was a Canadian professional ice hockey defenceman who played 6 games in the National Hockey League for the New York Americans during the 1930–31 season. The rest of his career, which lasted from 1930 to 1942, was spent in various minor leagues. Ellis was born in Beeton, Ontario and was the son of Walter Alvin Pringle and Mable Maude Campbell Ellis.

Career statistics

Regular season and playoffs

External links
 

1910 births
1990 deaths
Bronx Tigers players
Canadian expatriate ice hockey players in the United States
Canadian ice hockey defencemen
London Tecumsehs players
New Haven Eagles players
New York Americans players
Rochester Cardinals players
Toronto Marlboros players
Tulsa Oilers (AHA) players
Vancouver Lions players
Windsor Bulldogs (1929–1936) players